Dance Party USA is an American dance television show that aired on cable's USA Network from April 12, 1986, to June 27, 1992. It was originally a half-hour, but was expanded to an hour in 1987.

The program was shot live television-to-video tape at Power House Recording Studio in Camden, New Jersey and produced at WGBS in Philadelphia.  Its predecessor was Dancin' On Air, a program on Philadelphia's WPHL-TV.

Hosts 
1985-1986: Dave Raymond
1986-1989, 1992: Andy Gury, Annette Godfrey
1989-1991: Bobby Catalano, Heather "Princess" Day
1989-1990: Amy Brady, Alvin "Spicy" Ramirez, Cindy Stark, Romeo Levi Robinson King, Tyrone "Mr. Mitch" Mitchell
1989: Christy Springfield
1990: Aubrey Ayala, Kelly Berridge, Chris Bustard, Pete Conicelli, Joanna Mistretta, Matt Robbins, Desiree Wynder,

Noteworthy regulars
Kelly Ripa, actress and host of Live with Kelly and Ryan: Following a 3-year run as a dancer / segment host, in 1990 she landed what would be her most recognized acting role, Hayley Vaughn on All My Children.
Jeffrey Glassman known as "Jazzy Jeff" went on to be a semi successful DJ in South Jersey.  
Bobby Catalano was the man with the shades who would only remove his trademark sunglasses once a year on the Valentine's Day show. He was a very popular dancer and host. 
Bruce Williams, who was known as "Beastie Bruce" because he wore a Volkswagen chain as did the Beastie Boys, had a rap collection that did well in the Philadelphia area.  It was a break off of the Philadelphia rap group "Tuff Crew".
Dealin LaValley was a dancer on the show and went on to do Law & Order and national TV commercials. He now works as a celebrity makeup artist.
Heather Day was nicknamed "Princess" on the show because she was a fan of Prince and could be seen wearing dresses or other outfits like an eye-patch that reflected her devotion to the singer. She would meet the singer in 1994, two years after Dance Party USA ended its run. Today, Heather Day Slawek, a graduate of Temple University and mother of two children, owns a fitness studio which specializes in pole dancing. 
Heather Henderson known as Baby Heather on the show, is a professional burlesque, singer, model, filmmaker, producer and host for Ardent Atheists and Skeptically Yours podcasts. She currently is a member of Penn Jillette's No God Band and is a vocal activist for atheism and against psychics.
Alvin Ramirez, known as "Spicy" now going by AL-X Spicy (recording artist)

Controversy
On April 10, 2016, Philadelphia magazine published an article detailing a new feud between many of the people who were on Dance Party USA in their teens and the producer of the show.

References

External links
Dance Party USA and Dancin' On Air at Big Cartel

1986 American television series debuts
1992 American television series endings
1980s American variety television series
1990s American variety television series
Dance television shows
English-language television shows
Television in Philadelphia
USA Network original programming